Brian Yuzna is an American producer, director, and writer. He is best known for his work in the science fiction and horror film genres. Yuzna began his career as a producer for several films by director Stuart Gordon, such as Re-Animator (1985) and From Beyond (1986), before making his directorial debut with the satirical body horror film Society (1989).

He also served as a co-writer for the comedy Honey, I Shrunk the Kids (1989). Yuzna was the first American filmmaker to adapt a manga, Bio Booster Armor Guyver, into a live-action feature, The Guyver (1991). He has helmed several adaptations of the work of H. P. Lovecraft, and has assisted many first time directors, including Stuart Gordon, Christophe Gans, and Luis De La Madrid, in getting their projects made.

Early life
Yuzna was born in Manila, Philippines, to American parents. He grew up in Nicaragua, Puerto Rico, and Panama, before moving to the United States in the 1960s, settling in Atlanta, Georgia. Yuzna was raised a Roman Catholic. Throughout the 1970s, Yuzna lived on a commune in North Carolina and worked jobs as a carpenter and at a restaurant.

Career
Yuzna began his career as a producer, co-producing the horror films Re-Animator (1985), From Beyond (1986), and Dolls (1987) for his friend, director Stuart Gordon. He also co-wrote From Beyond. The same year, Yuzna co-wrote the comedy Honey, I Shrunk the Kids alongside Gordon. In 1989, he made his directorial debut with the satirical body horror film Society, which focuses on a wealthy Beverly Hills community who are of a mutant species who feed on the social classes beneath them.

Yuzna went on to direct a series of horror sequels, including Bride of Re-Animator (1990), Silent Night, Deadly Night 4: Initiation (1990), and Return of the Living Dead 3 (1993), before directing The Dentist (1996), a horror film about a murderous Los Angeles dentist who dentally tortures his victims. Yuzna also directed its sequel, The Dentist 2 (1998).

Having collected a large following in Europe, Yuzna started Fantastic Factory, with Julio Fernández, a label under the Barcelona film company Filmax, in the early-2000s. His goal was to produce "modestly budgeted genre (horror, science fiction, fantasy) films for the international market (shot in English language) using genre talent from all around the world and to develop local talent".

He was last working as the producer of the Wehrmacht zombie movie Worst Case Scenario, directed by Richard Raaphorst, which takes place after a fictional World Cup 2006 finale between Germany and Netherlands where Germany loses and seeks revenge with a zombie invasion. In May 2009, it was announced that this project was dead. The film eventually became Frankenstein's Army and was released in 2013. After four years, he returned to the director's chair and filmed Amphibious 3-D which stars Michael Paré and Francis Magee.

In 2014, in Hollywood, the Cinefamily screened and celebrated the 25th anniversary of Honey, I Shrunk the Kids with Yuzna as guest of honor. In 2015, a retrospective of his work of 30 years, Brian Yuzna, A Retrospective, was presented and screened at the theater in the Soho House West Hollywood, curated by Diana Lado and produced by Logan Yuzna. In 2016, a new Yuzna-directed film was announced, The Plastic Surgeon, starring Corbin Bernsen and producer by Yuzna's production house, Dark Arts Entertainment.

Distinctions 
 2014: Honorary Member of the Catalan Academy of Cinema in Barcelona

Personal life
He is married to Cathy Cherry Yuzna. They have four children: Conan Yuzna, Zoe Yuzna, Noah Yuzna and Logan Yuzna. He also has a daughter, Mercedes Bauer / Mercedes Perez-Bode from a previous relationship.

Filmography

Guest appearances
 Stephen King's World of Horror (1986)
 The Incredibly Strange Film Show (1989)
 Fear in the Dark (1991)
 Clive Barker's A-Z of Horror (1997)
 Metrópolis (2001)
 Working with a Master: Stuart Gordon (2006)
 Re-Animator Resurrectus (2007)
 Durch die Nacht mit … (2007)
Science of Horror (2008)
 Nightmares in Red, White and Blue (2009)

References

Sources

External links

 

American male screenwriters
American film production company founders
American film producers
American film directors
American film directors of Filipino descent
Filipino film directors
Horror film directors
Filipino emigrants to the United States
Living people
Screenwriters from Georgia (U.S. state)
Writers from Atlanta
Year of birth missing (living people)